Anabel Medina Garrigues was the defending champion, but did not compete this year.

Mariana Díaz Oliva won the title by defeating Vera Zvonareva 6–7(6–8), 6–1, 6–3 in the final.

Seeds

Draw

Finals

Top half

Bottom half

References

External links
 Official results archive (WTA)
 Official results archive (ITF)

Singles
Internazionali Femminili di Palermo - Singles